Cocaine is a 1922 British crime film directed by Graham Cutts and starring Hilda Bayley, Flora Le Breton, Ward McAllister and Cyril Raymond. It depicts the distribution of cocaine by gangsters through a series of London nightclubs and the revenge a man seeks after his daughter's death.

Because of its depiction of drug use, it was the most controversial British film of the 1920s. Authorities feared that it might encourage the spread of narcotics. However, as it had a clear message about the dangers of drugs, censors eventually passed it in June 1922 and it was released in cinemas under the alternative title While London Sleeps.

The Chinese gangster Min Fu was reportedly based on real-life criminal Brilliant Chang.

Cast
 Hilda Bayley as Jenny
 Flora Le Breton as Madge Webster
 Ward McAllister as Min Fu
 Cyril Raymond as Stanley  
 Tony Fraser as Loki  
 Teddy Arundell as Montagu Webster

References

Bibliography
 Robertson, James Crighton. The Hidden Cinema: British Film Censorship in Action, 1913–1975. Routledge, 1993.
 Sweet, Matthew. Shepperton Babylon: The Lost Worlds of British Cinema. Faber and Faber, 2005.

External links

1922 films
1922 crime films
Films directed by Graham Cutts
British crime films
British silent feature films
Films set in London
Triad films
British black-and-white films
1920s English-language films
1920s British films